Cibyra mexicanensis is a species of moth of the family Hepialidae. It is known from Mexico, from which its species epithet is derived.

References

External links
Hepialidae genera

Hepialidae
Moths of Central America
Endemic flora of Mexico
Moths described in 1953